The 1988 Rous Cup was the fourth staging of the Rous Cup international football competition, based around the England–Scotland football rivalry. For the second year in succession, a third team was invited to create a three-team tournament.

After having Brazil's participation in the previous year, the FA again invited South American opposition to participate, this time Colombia.

England won the competition for a second time after being the only team to win a game; the two other matches ended in draws.

Results
All times listed are British Summer Time (UTC+1)

Scotland vs Colombia

England vs Scotland

England vs Colombia

Final standings

Goalscorers

1 goal
 Andrés Escobar
 Peter Beardsley
 Gary Lineker

Rous Cup
Rous
Rous
Rous
International association football competitions hosted by England
International association football competitions hosted by Scotland
May 1988 sports events in the United Kingdom